Skorba is a village in the Municipality of Hajdina in northeastern Slovenia. The area is part of the traditional region of Styria. It is included with the rest of the municipality in the Drava Statistical Region.

A number of archaeological finds close to the settlement, including a villa rustica, are associated with the nearby Roman town of Poetovio.

References

External links
Skorba on Geopedia

Populated places in the Municipality of Hajdina